Semyonovo-Krasilovo is a rural locality (a selo) and the administrative center of Semyonovo-Krasilovsky Selsoviet, Kytmanovsky District, Altai Krai, Russia. The population was 493 as of 2013. There are 10 streets.

Geography 
Semyonovo-Krasilovo is located 18 km northeast of Kytmanovo (the district's administrative centre) by road. Novokhmelyovka and Tyakhta are the nearest rural localities.

References 

Rural localities in Kytmanovsky District